Estelle is an unincorporated community in Walker County, in the U.S. state of Georgia.

History
A post office called Estelle was established in 1883, and remained in operation until it was discontinued in 1905. The community took its name from the Estelle Mining Company.

References

Unincorporated communities in Walker County, Georgia
Unincorporated communities in Georgia (U.S. state)